For You is the sixth studio album by Japanese singer-songwriter Tatsuro Yamashita, released in January 1982.

Overview
In 1980, the single Ride on Time became a hit, and the album of the same name. As a result, he would frequently hold live concerts throughout 1981. It was difficult to plan for the next album, but his band continued to improve as they performed live. With the success of his previous album, Yamashita said, "This album finally fulfills my dream from the time of Sugar Babe, I wanted to record as much as I wanted without worrying about budget and time".

When the album was released in 1982, it would become his second hit studio album, peaking at number one on the Oricon LP charts and two on the CT charts. This was also his last studio album under the AIR/RVC label. Later that year, he would marry Mariya Takeuchi on April 6. Originally, the song "Morning Glory" was written for Mariya Takeuchi's album Miss M. The songs "Sparkle" and "Loveland Island" were used as commercial songs for Suntory beer. Meanwhile, the song "Your Eyes" was used as a commercial song for Nissui starring Bunta Sugawara.

At this time, advances were made in car stereos and Walkman devices that made it possible for music to retain sufficient audio quality while on the go. The album was produced and promoted with this and mind to reinforce the resort pop feeling, going as for as making the slogan "Summer, the sea, Tatsuro!" officially cementing his image as the "Summer Song Guy". Originally, Yamashita was thinking of requesting Hiroshi Nagai to make the album cover. But at that time, he already decided to work on the album cover for Eiichi Ohtaki's album A Long Vacation. Eizin Suzuki instead worked on the album cover art.

In the 2002 reissue of the album, four bonus songs were added into the tracklist. One of the bonus tracks "Every Night" was originally from the album Miss M, Yamashita also recorded a cover of the song but ended up being unpublished, it was later remastered and was included in the reissue. In addition, Loveland, Island / Your Eyes was released as a single on the same year. The song Loveland, Island was used as the ending theme for the Japanese drama series The Long Love Letter.

Track listing

2002 reissue

Credits
Sparkle
Tatsuro Yamashita: Electric Guitar, Percussion & Background Vocals
Jun Aoyama: Drums
Koki Ito: Bass
Hiroyuki Namba: Keyboards
Hidefumi Toki: Alto Sax Solo
Minako Yoshida: Background Vocals
Shin Kazuhara: Trumpet
Masahiro Kobayashi: Trumpet
Shigeharu Mukai: Trombone
Tadanori Konakawa: Trombone
Takeru Muraoka: Tenor Sax
Shunzo Sunahara: Baritone Sax

Music Book
Tatsuro Yamashita: Percussion & Background Vocals
Yuichi Togashiki: Drums
Akira Okazawa: Bass
Tsunehide Matsuki: Electric Guitar
Hiroshi Sato: Electric Piano
Motoya Hamaguchi: Percussion
Shigeharu Mukai: Trombone Solo
Minako Yoshida: Background Vocals
Shin Kazuhara: Trumpet
Masahiro Kobayashi: Trumpet
Yasuo Hirauchi: Trombone
Sumio Okada: Trombone
Takeru Muraoka: Tenor Sax
Shunzo Sunahara: Baritone Sax
Tadaaki Ohno: Strings Concert Master

Interlude A Part I
Tatsuro Yamashita: All Voices

Morning Glory
Tatsuro Yamashita: Acoustic Piano, Electric Guitar, Marimba, Percussion & Background Vocals
Jun Aoyama: Drums
Koki Ito: Bass
Kazuo Shiina: Electric Guitar
Hiroyuki Namba: Electric Piano
Shin Kazuhara: Trumpet
Masahiro Kobayashi: Trumpet
Shigeharu Mukai: Trombone
Tadanori Konakawa: Trombone
Takeru Muraoka: Tenor Sax
Shunzo Sunahara: Baritone Sax

Interlude A Part II
Tatsuro Yamashita: All Voices

Futari
Tatsuro Yamashita: ELectric Guitar (Right), Percussion & Background Vocals
Jun Aoyama: Drums
Koki Ito: Bass
Kazuo Shiina: Electric Guitar (Left)
Hiroshi Sato: Acoustic Piano & Electric Piano
Hiroyuki Namba: KORG λ String (KORG Lambda)
Hidefumi Toki: Alto Sax
Tadaaki Ohno: Strings Concert Master

Loveland, Island
Tatsuro Yamashita: ELectric Guitar (Right) & Background Vocals
Jun Aoyama: Drums
Koki Ito: Bass
Kazuo Shiina: Electric Guitar (Left)
Hiroyuki Namba: Keyboard
Motoya Hamaguchi: Percussion
Hidefumi Toki: Alto Sax Solo
Keiko Yamakawa: Harp

Interlude B Part I
Tatsuro Yamashita: All Voices

Love Talkin' (Honey It's You)
Tatsuro Yamashita: Electric Guitar, Electric Piano, Acoustic Piano. Glocken, Percussion & Background Vocals
Jun Aoyama: Drums
Koki Ito: Bass
Hiroyuki Namba: KORG PS-3100 Synthesizer
Keiko Yamakawa: Harp
Minako Yoshida: Background Vocals

Hey Reporter!
Tatsuro Yamashita: Electric Guitar, Electric Piano & Background Vocals
Jun Aoyama: Drums
Koki Ito: Bass
Hiroyuki Namba: Acoustic Piano

Interlude B Part II
Tatsuro Yamashita: All Voices

Your Eyes
Tatsuro Yamashita: Electric Guitar, Electric Piano, Electric Sitar, Percussion & Background Vocals
Jun Aoyama: Drums
Koki Ito: Bass
Tadahide Yoshikawa: Acoustic Guitar
Hiroyuki Namba: Acoustic Piano
Hidefumi Toki: Alto Sax Solo
Tadaaki Ohno: Strings Concert Master
Hiroki Inui: Strings Arrangement

あまく危険な香り [Amaku Kiken na Kaori]
(same personnel for TV Instrumental Version 1)

Tatsuro Yamashita: Electric Guitar (Left), Acoustic Piano Solo & Percussion
Jun Aoyama: Drums
Koki Ito: Bass
Tsunehide Matsuki: Electric Guitar (Right)
Hiroyuki Namba: Electric Piano
Motoya Hamaguchi: Percussion
Shin Kazuhara: Trumpet
Masahiro Kobayashi: Trumpet
Shigeharu Mukai: Trombone
Tadanori Konakawa: Trombone
Takeru Muraoka: Tenor Sax
Shunzo Sunahara: Baritone Sax
Tadaaki Ohno: Strings Concert Master
Masahide Sakuma: Strings Arrangement

あまく危険な香り [Amaku Kiken na Kaori, TV Instrumental Version 2]
Tatsuro Yamashita: Electric Guitar & Percussion
Jun Aoyama: Drums
Koki Ito: Bass
Hiroyuki Namba: Keyboards
Hidefumi Toki: Alto Sax Solo

Every Night
Tatsuro Yamashita: Electric Guitar & Percussion
Jun Aoyama: Drums
Koki Ito: Bass
Hiroyuki Namba: Keyboards
Motoya Hamaguchi: Percussion

Production / Credits
Taken from the inner sleeve notes of the album. (RAL-8801)
Produced by Tatsuro YYamashita for Smile Company
Associate Producer: Ryuzo "Junior" Kosugi
Production Co-ordinator: Nobumasa Uchida
Recording Engineer Tamotsu Yoshida, Toshiro Itoh
Re-mix Engineer: Tamotsu Yoshida
Assistant Engineers: Masato Ohmori, Shigemi Watanabe, Akira Fukada
Instrument Maintenance: Takeshi Yamamoto
Recorded at CBS/SONY Roppongi Studio A & B
Re-mixed at CBS/SONY Roppongi Studio B
Mastering Studio: JVC Yokohama Cutting Studio
Disc Mastering Engineer: Tohru Kotetsu
Cover Illustration: Eizin Suzuki
Design: Hiroshi Takahara
Inner Photograph: Nobuo Kubota

Chart positions

Awards

Release history

References 

1982 albums
Tatsuro Yamashita albums